In computer chip design and manufacture VHDL-VITAL or simply VITAL, VHDL Initiative Towards ASIC Libraries, refers to the IEEE Standard 1076.4 Timing.

References

Hardware description languages